Totoya Gaon is a village in Majuli district of Assam in India. 

Villages in Majuli district